Peschany is a rural locality (a khutor) in Shaposhnikovskoye Rural Settlement, Olkhovatsky District, Voronezh Oblast, Russia. The population was 64 as of 2010.

Geography 
Peschany is located 12 km southeast of Olkhovatka (the district's administrative centre) by road. Shaposhnikovka is the nearest rural locality.

References 

Rural localities in Olkhovatsky District